Suad Švraka (6 October 1927 – 24 August 1995) was a Bosnian and Yugoslav professional footballer. He was a member of FK Sarajevo from 1947 to 1959, before joining Borac Banja Luka for two seasons. He is the seventh most capped player in FK Sarajevo history.

International career
He represented Yugoslavia internationally, earning one cap against Scotland in 1955.

Personal life
Švraka died on 24 August 1995 in Sarajevo during the Bosnian War. He was hit by a grenade while on his way home from the grounds of FK Sarajevo,  from the club building.

References

External links

1927 births
1995 deaths
Footballers from Sarajevo
Association football defenders
Yugoslav footballers
Yugoslavia international footballers
FK Sarajevo players
FK Borac Banja Luka players
Yugoslav First League players
Civilians killed in the Bosnian War